Precious is a predominantly feminine given name derived from the English word meaning "of great worth." It is also in occasional use for males.

It first appeared in the top 1,000 most popular names for girls in the United States in 1978, when it ranked at 989. It was ranked in the top 500 names given to newborn American girls between 1987 and 2002. It has since fallen in popularity and was last ranked in the top 1,000 names for girls in 2010. In 2011, there were 195 newborn American girls given the name; in 2012 there were 154 American girls given the name. In the United States, the name has been used predominantly by African Americans. According to one study, of 454 girls named Precious in California during the 1990s, 431 of them were African American. 

It remained a popular name in the Philippines, where it was the ninth most popular name given to newborn girls in 2011. There were 394 newborn Filipino girls named Precious in 2011.

People
 Precious Achiuwa (born 1999), Nigerian basketball player
 Precious Michelle Thomas, (born 1993) San Antonio Texas, [./Https://queenpleasure.wordpress.com/%3Ffbclid=PAAaZHkOHHxIN-mlXp1N2mEc_FTS5vU_7MYdgy7vCrtABu2bucoNjG6WlnzU8 WordPress] ,investor, copywriter, entrepreneur.
 Precious Adams, Americandancer
 Precious Bryant (born 1942), American country blues, gospel and folk guitarist
 Precious Dede (born 1980), Nigerian female football goalkeeper
 Precious Emuejeraye (born 1983), Singaporean footballer
 Precious McKenzie (born 1936), South African-born weightlifter
 Precious Sekibo (born 1958), Nigerian doctor and former Federal Minister of Transportation
 Precious Wilson (born 1957), Jamaican soul singer
 Precious Doe, pseudonym given to the corpse of an initially unidentified female child

Fictional characters
 Precious Ramotswe, the main character in The No. 1 Ladies' Detective Agency book series
Claireece "Precious" Jones, the main character in the novel "Push (novel)" by Sapphire (author) and the 2009 movie adaptation Precious (film)*

Notes

English feminine given names